Łojki can refer to:

 Łojki, Podlaskie Voivodeship
 Łojki, Silesian Voivodeship